Mützelburg is a German surname. Notable people with the surname include:

 Bernd Mützelburg (born 1944), German diplomat
 Rolf Mützelburg (1913–1942), German U-boat commander

German-language surnames